Agent Dash is an endless runner video game developed by Full Fat for iOS and Android and published in 2012.

Reception

The iOS version received "generally favorable reviews" according to the review aggregation website Metacritic.

References

External links
 

2012 video games
Android (operating system) games
Endless runner games
Full Fat games
IOS games
Single-player video games
Spy video games
Video games developed in the United Kingdom